Stefano Desimoni  (born 12 April 1988) is an Italian professional baseball Outfielder, for Parma Baseball in the Italian Baseball League.

He also played for the Italy national baseball team in the 2010 European Baseball Championship, 2012 European Baseball Championship and 2013 World Baseball Classic.

References

External links

1988 births
2013 World Baseball Classic players
2015 WBSC Premier12 players
2016 European Baseball Championship players
Baseball outfielders
Italian baseball players
Living people
Sportspeople from Parma